Laurneá Wilkerson is an American singer, songwriter and actress. Under the name Laurneá, she has released four studio albums including Betta Listen in 1997, which includes the singles "Can't Let Go" (#55 on the US Billboard 200, #20 on Hot R&B/Hip-Hop Songs), "Infatuation" (#37 on Hot R&B/Hip-Hop Songs) and "Days of Youth" (#36 in the UK Singles Chart). Wilkerson has also sung vocals for the bands Arrested Development and Loose Ends.

Wilkerson has appeared in the films Hoodlum, School Daze and Sing.

Discography

Studio albums
1997: Betta Listen (Top R&B/Hip-Hop Albums #80)
2000: Laurneá II
2003: New Territory
2005: I Remember

Compilation albums
2006: The Collection

References

Living people
African-American actresses
20th-century African-American women singers
African-American women singer-songwriters
Year of birth missing (living people)
21st-century African-American women singers